Viktoria Pavlovich (Łacinka: Viktoryja Uładzimiraŭna Paŭłovič; born 8 May 1978) is a Belarusian table tennis player who plays for Turkish powerhouse Fenerbahçe SK. She won the women's singles at the 2010 and 2012 European Championships. She was born in Minsk, and resides there. Her twin sister Veronika Pavlovich is an Olympic table tennis player as well.

She competed at the 2008 Summer Olympics, reaching the third round of the singles competition. She competed in both singles and doubles in 2004.  At the 2012 Summer Olympics she reached the fourth round.

References

External links
 

1978 births
Living people
Belarusian female table tennis players
Table tennis players at the 2000 Summer Olympics
Table tennis players at the 2004 Summer Olympics
Table tennis players at the 2008 Summer Olympics
Table tennis players at the 2012 Summer Olympics
Table tennis players at the 2016 Summer Olympics
Olympic table tennis players of Belarus
Sportspeople from Minsk
Belarusian twins
Twin sportspeople
Fenerbahçe table tennis players